Adampur Assembly constituency may refer to 
 Adampur, Haryana Assembly constituency
 Adampur, Punjab Assembly constituency